Elmwood is a neighborhood in West Hartford, Connecticut that encompasses the area south of Interstate 84 and east of South Main Street, extending to the borders of neighboring Newington and Hartford. It is primarily a middle-class and working-class enclave of 10,800 residents composed mostly of postwar single-family homes and duplexes.

History

As with the rest of West Hartford, Elmwood was mostly rural and sparsely populated, consisting of farmland and agriculture, until suburban residential development unfolded throughout the 20th century. Once home to a substantial Irish and Italian American community, Elmwood today is West Hartford's most racially diverse section of town. Household incomes tend to be more modest than other areas of West Hartford, and the neighborhood contains a higher concentration of blacks, Hispanics and Asian Americans.

Education

Public schools

 Charter Oak International Academy

Private schools
 St. Brigid-St. Augustine Partnership School

Infrastructure
Elmwood's main thoroughfares include New Britain Avenue, Newington Road and New Park Avenue. The commercial section of New Britain Avenue is known as Elmwood Center, an area composed of local businesses, services, and ethnic restaurants. Newington Road and New Park Avenue are formerly areas where the manufacturing sector thrived in previous decades and have experienced steady revitalizations in recent years. Elmwood is the site of the former Talcott Middle School, which has since been renovated into luxury condominiums. It is also home to Beachland Park and the southernmost point of the town's Trout Brook Trail.

Elmwood is a stop on CTfastrack near the intersection of New Britain Avenue and New Park Avenue.

References

West Hartford, Connecticut
Neighborhoods in Connecticut